STS-134 (ISS assembly flight ULF6) was the penultimate mission of NASA's Space Shuttle program and the 25th and last spaceflight of . This flight delivered the Alpha Magnetic Spectrometer and an ExPRESS Logistics Carrier to the International Space Station. Mark Kelly served as the mission commander. STS-134 was expected to be the final Space Shuttle mission if STS-135 did not receive funding from Congress. However, in February 2011, NASA stated that STS-135 would fly "regardless" of the funding situation. STS-135, flown by Atlantis, took advantage of the processing for STS-335, the Launch on Need mission that would have been necessary if the STS-134 crew became stranded in orbit.

Changes in the design of the main payload, AMS-02, as well as delays to STS-133, led to delays in the mission. The first launch attempt on April 29, 2011, was scrubbed at 12:20 pm by launch managers due to problems with two heaters on one of the orbiter's auxiliary power units (APU). Endeavour launched successfully at 08:56:28 EDT (12:56:28 UTC) on May 16, 2011, and landed for the final time on June 1, 2011.

Crew

NASA announced the STS-134 crew on August 10, 2009.

Background

The Space Shuttle had been scheduled to be retired from service after STS-133, but controversy over the cancellation of several International Space Station components, most notably the Alpha Magnetic Spectrometer, in order to meet deadlines for the retirement of the shuttle, caused the United States Government to consider ordering an additional mission. On June 19, 2008, the United States House of Representatives passed the NASA Authorization Act of 2008, giving NASA funding for one additional mission to "deliver science experiments to the station".

The same mandate was included in the U.S. Senate version of the NASA Authorization Act that was unanimously approved by the Senate Committee on Commerce, Science, and Transportation on June 25, 2008. It was amended and passed by the full Senate on September 25, 2008, passed by the House on September 27, 2008, and signed by President George W. Bush on October 15, 2008. Bush had previously opposed any additional shuttle missions, as they could delay the transition to Project Constellation. In the spring of 2009, the Obama Administration included funds for the STS-134 mission in its proposed 2010 NASA budget.

STS-134 was planned to be the final regularly scheduled mission of the NASA Space Shuttle Program, but with the passing in 2011 of an appropriations bill authorizing the conversion of STS-335 to STS-135, this was no longer the case. It was also originally scheduled to coincide with Expedition 26 before delays in the Space Shuttle launch schedule pushed it past that Expedition. If STS-134 had launched during Expedition 26, then Mark Kelly and Expedition 26 commander Scott Kelly would have become the first siblings (and twins) to fly in space at the same time.

Shuttle Commander Mark Kelly's wife, U.S. Representative Gabby Giffords, flew to the Kennedy Space Center (KSC) in Florida to view the first launch attempt, her first trip since moving from Tucson to Houston for rehabilitation after being seriously wounded in the January 2011 Tucson shooting. On May 16, Giffords was again at KSC for the launch, which was "one of the most anticipated in years," according to The New York Times.

U.S. President Barack Obama scheduled a visit to Kennedy Space Center on April 29, 2011, to view the launch, and despite the canceled launch attempt he toured an Orbiter Processing Facility at Launch Complex 39 and met with Giffords and the six crewmembers.

Mission payload

Alpha Magnetic Spectrometer 2

The Alpha Magnetic Spectrometer 2 (AMS-02) was carried to the ISS in Endeavours payload bay, and was attached to the ISS's S3 truss segment. The AMS-02 unit is a particle physics detector which contains a large permanent magnet, and is designed to search for antimatter and investigate the origin and structure of dark matter.

According to the original design plan, a cryogenic, superconducting magnet system was developed for the AMS-02. This was reported by NASA to be a critical technology, granting the instrument the high sensitivity needed to achieve mission objectives. Late in its development, however, poorly understood anomalous heating in the cryogenic magnet system was discovered. As a result, the AMS-02 experiment leader, Samuel C. C. Ting, decided to replace the superconducting magnet inside the spectrometer with the permanent magnet previously used in AMS-01.

ExPRESS Logistics Carrier 3

The ExPRESS Logistics Carrier 3 (ELC3) carried several Orbital Replacement Units (ORU) that were too large or too heavy for other spacecraft to carry to the ISS. These ORUs included a High Pressure Gas Tank (HPGT), an Ammonia Tank Assembly (ATA), the S band Antenna Sub-System Assembly #2 & 3 (SASA), a Special Purpose Dextrous Manipulator (SPDM) Arm with Orbital Replacement Unit change-out mechanism, a Space Test Program Houston 3 Department of Defense payload, and a spare ELC pallet controller avionics box.

Materials on International Space Station Experiment
The STS-134 mission delivered the Materials on International Space Station Experiment 8 (MISSE) experiments, and returned the completed MISSE 7 experiments to Earth. MISSE 7 had been delivered to the ISS on STS-129 in 2009.

Sensor Test of Orion Rel-nav Risk Mitigation Detailed Test Objective kit
The Orion Rel-nav Sensor was mounted on the Orbiter Docking System (ODS) in Trajectory Control Sensor slot 1 and on an Adaptive Payload Carrier in the bay 3 port of the Payload Bay. For the STORRM Detailed Test Objective (DTO), after Endeavour undocked, it completed its normal fly-around of the station. The crew then guided Endeavour back towards the station, flying a nominal orbiter trajectory for docking to the ISS's Pressurized Mating Adapter-2. However, the shuttle did not actually dock with the ISS again; instead, it was positioned below the station.

On STS-131, the docking target on the ISS was enhanced with reflectors, to allow for the characterization of the Orion Rel-Nav sensors' performance during STS-134's rendezvous and proximity operations with the ISS. These proximity operations were tested during approach and docking, undocking, flyaround (time permitting), and during a modified separation from the ISS. During the modified separation, the crew performed a series of re-rendezvous burns that put the orbiter on an Orion-like rendezvous profile. Afterwards, instead of re-docking to the ISS, the crew performed a full separation.

GLACIER Freezer Module
STS-134 carried a new Glacier module to the ISS and returned two old ones to Earth. The Glacier units were used to store and return science samples on the Space Shuttle.

Orbiter Boom Sensor System

STS-134 left its Orbiter Boom Sensor System (OBSS) permanently on the ISS for use in reaching places that the Canadarm2 cannot get to on its own. The usefulness of having an OBSS available for use at the station was demonstrated during Scott Parazynski's repair of the torn P6 solar panel on STS-120. The feasibility of leaving an OBSS attached to ISS for a long period of time was demonstrated when the STS-123 mission left one behind for use during the subsequent STS-124 mission.

Lego kits
Endeavour brought 13 Lego kits to the ISS, where astronauts built Lego models to see how they would react in microgravity, as part of the Lego Bricks in Space program. The results were shared with schools as part of an educational project.

Shuttle LIFE
The LIFE precursor mission was launched aboard Endeavour. This Planetary Society project was to test the mission destined for Fobos-Grunt. The stage rehearsal was deemed fully successful.

STEM Bars
Endeavour brought specialized nutrition bars, called "STEM Bars", to the ISS. These were created by high school students and sisters Mikayla and Shannon Diesch. The nutrition bars were certified for spaceflight by meeting a specific NASA-developed nutritional profile, and had to pass strict microbial testing. The STEM Bars were flown to support the work of the Battle Creek, Michigan-based sisters to raise awareness of the importance of STEM education among their peers, an outreach effort which they started after they won the 2010 Conrad Foundation Spirit of Innovation Awards.

The Little Mole
A figurine of the Little Mole was successfully brought back to Earth by Andrew Feustel. It was later presented to the character's creator, Zdeněk Miler, and used for space science popularization mainly in the Czech Republic.

Mission experiments
Endeavour performed four Department of Defense payloads of opportunity: MAUI, SEITI, RAMBO-2, and SIMPLEX. All four of these experiments required engine and thruster firings, and were to be completed only if there was sufficient propellant on board Endeavour.

Mission milestones
The mission marked:
 165th NASA crewed space flight
 134th Shuttle mission since STS-1
 25th and last flight of Endeavour
 36th Shuttle mission to the ISS
 109th post-Challenger mission
 21st post-Columbia mission
 Last non-US astronaut to fly on a Space Shuttle mission (Col. Roberto Vittori, Italy)
 First Papal blessing and call to astronauts in space

Shuttle processing

Rollout
Rollout of Endeavour commenced on March 10, 2011, at 19:56 EST and terminated on March 11, 2011, at 03:49 EST.

Launchpad fatality
At around 07:40 EDT on March 14, 2011, United Space Alliance engineer James Vanover committed suicide by jumping from the STS-134 launchpad. Endeavour was at the pad when the incident occurred. As a result, work on the Space Shuttle was suspended for the day while grief counseling was offered to the workforce. NASA officials believed this to be the first launchpad fatality since 1981.

Mission timeline

May 16 (Flight Day 1 – Launch)

Endeavour lifted off from Kennedy Space Center's Launch Complex 39 at 08:56 EDT on May 16, 2011. Once the shuttle and crew were on-orbit, they set about preparing the shuttle for the mission ahead. The first tasks they completed were opening the payload bay doors, activating the Ku-band antenna, and activating the Shuttle Remote Manipulator System (SRMS), also known as the Canadarm. Prior to this, commander Mark Kelly and pilot Greg Johnson completed an engine firing, known as the OMS-2 burn, to circularize the orbit of the shuttle. They also completed another engine firing, the NC-1 burn, to help the shuttle catch up to the International Space Station (ISS). After completing these initial tasks, the crew activated the Alpha Magnetic Spectrometer, allowing it to be monitored by teams on the ground. Later in the crew's work day, they downlinked video recordings that had been shot of the external tank by mission specialist Mike Fincke.

May 17 (Flight Day 2 – OBSS inspection)

On flight day 2, the crew of Endeavour completed several tasks in preparation for the docking on flight day 3. The first and most important of these tasks was surveying the shuttle's Thermal Protection System (TPS). The Orbiter Boom Sensor System (OBSS) was used to survey the wing leading edge and nose cone. The Shuttle Remote Manipulator System (SRMS, or Canadarm 1) was also used to look at the thermal tiles and blankets on and around the Orbital Maneuvering System (OMS) pods. After the survey was complete, the Express Logistics Carrier (ELC) 3 was grappled by the SRMS. While the survey was conducted by Greg Johnson and mission specialists Roberto Vittori and Greg Chamitoff, the rest of the crew prepared the orbiter for docking. This included installing tools such as a center-line camera in the Orbiter Docking System, along with various other sensors used to gauge distance and speed. Kelly and mission specialists Mike Fincke and Drew Feustel furthermore checked out the two spacesuits carried on Endeavour, in preparation for the mission's four planned spacewalks.

May 18 (Flight Day 3 – ISS rendezvous and ELC installation)

Flight day 3 saw the docking of Endeavour to the Pressurized Mating Adapter (PMA) 2 on the ISS. The docking occurred on May 18, 2011, at 10:14 UTC. After the shuttle docked, the six astronauts of STS-134 joined the Expedition 27 crew on board the ISS. The joint crews completed a series of leak checks and opened the hatches at 11:38 UTC. Once the hatches were open, the joint crew held a welcome ceremony and completed a safety briefing. The first task for the joint crew was to unberth the Express Logistics Carrier (ELC) 3, and attach it to its final location on the ISS's Port 3 (P3) truss segment. Express Logistics Carrier 3 was removed from the payload bay of Endeavour by the SRMS and handed off to the Space Station Remote Manipulator System (SSRMS), also known as Canadarm2. The ELC 3 was finally installed at 16:18 UTC. Kelly began to transfer oxygen from space shuttle Endeavour to the ISS. Mike Fincke and Drew Feustel transferred the two Extravehicular Mobility Units (EMU) to the ISS's Quest Airlock in preparation for their use during the mission's four spacewalks.

May 19 (Flight Day 4 – AMS-2 installation)

The STS-134 crew installed the AMS-2 on flight day 4. AMS-2 was lifted out of Endeavours payload bay using the Canadarm, operated by Drew Feustel and Roberto Vittori. It was handed off to Canadarm2, which was operated by Greg Chamitoff and Greg Johnson, and was installed in its final location on the S3 truss segment at 09:46 UTC. Immediately after the installation, crews on the ground began activating the experiment. The installation of the AMS-2 marked the completion of the US Orbital Segment of the International Space Station. Later in the day, Greg Chamitoff, Drew Feustel and Mike Fincke prepared the Extravehicular Mobility Units (EMU) that Chamitoff and Feustel would wear during their spacewalk on flight day 5. The trio was also assisted by commander Mark Kelly in preparing the tools required for the Extravehicular Activity (EVA). While this was going on, Expedition 27 crew members Paolo Nespoli, Cady Coleman and Ron Garan assisted the rest of the STS-134 crew in completing transfers to and from Endeavour. Late in the crew day, the two crews performed an EVA procedures review. After the review, Chamitoff and Feustel camped out in the Quest Airlock overnight, in preparation for the mission's first spacewalk. The campout was done with the airlock's air pressure reduced, so as to purge nitrogen bubbles from the astronauts' blood and thus prevent decompression sickness. Members of both crews also conducted two in-flight interviews with media on the ground, including PBS NewsHour, National Public Radio, Associated Press, Reuters and Fox News. The crew also answered questions that were relayed up to them by Miles O'Brien for Google.

May 20 (Flight Day 5 – EVA 1)
The first spacewalk of the STS-134 mission was completed on flight day 5. Drew Feustel and Greg Chamitoff completed the installation of a new set of MISSE experiments, and also started installing a new wireless video system, but were stopped when a CO2 sensor failed in Chamitoff's suit. After the failure, the pair were told to install an ammonia jumper between the Port 3 (P3) and Port 6 (P6) truss segments. The spacewalkers furthermore installed a new light on the Crew Equipment Translation Aid (CETA) cart on the Starboard 3 (S3) truss segment, and a cover on the starboard Solar Alpha Rotary Joint (SARJ). The installation of the wireless video system was completed during the third EVA. While the 6-hour-and-19-minute-long spacewalk was in progress, members of the STS-134 crew completed more equipment transfers between Endeavour and the ISS. Expedition 27 crew members also prepared for the departure of Dmitri Kondratyev, Paolo Nespoli and Cady Coleman.

May 21 (Flight Day 6)

On flight day 6, the members of Endeavours crew performed a focused inspection of an area of thermal protection tiles on the bottom of the orbiter. The tiles were damaged during launch, and detailed data provided by the Orbiter Boom Sensor System (OBSS) was needed to make sure the orbiter could re-enter Earth's atmosphere safely. The focused inspection started with the Canadarm2 grappling the OBSS in the middle of the boom and handing it off to the shuttle's Canadarm, which was controlled by pilot Greg Johnson and mission specialists Mike Fincke and Roberto Vittori. The inspection process took approximately two hours to complete, and resulted in the Thermal Protection System (TPS) being cleared for entry. After the inspection was complete, Fincke joined Drew Feustel to get their spacesuits ready for the second spacewalk of the mission on flight day 7. The pair performed the standard overnight campout procedure to get ready for the EVA. Later in the crew day, the STS-134 crew assembled with the Expedition 27 crew in the Kibo module. The joint crew spoke with Pope Benedict XVI, answering several questions asked by the Pope. This marked the first time a Pope has spoken to astronauts in space. Benedict also blessed Mark Kelly's wife Gabby Giffords, who had undergone skull surgery earlier in the week, and offered condolences to Paolo Nespoli for the loss of his mother.

May 22 (Flight Day 7 – EVA 2)

The second EVA of STS-134 was conducted on flight day 7 by Drew Feustel and Mike Fincke. The spacewalk, the sixth-longest in the history of spaceflight at the time, lasted 8 hours and 7 minutes, significantly longer than the planned 6 hours and 30 minutes. The excursion also marked the second-longest spacewalk conducted from the ISS. During the spacewalk, Fincke and Feustel hooked up a jumper to transfer  of ammonia to the Port 6 Photovoltaic Thermal Control System (PVTCS), lubricated the Solar Alpha Rotary Joint (SARJ) and one of the "hands" on Dextre, and installed a stowage beam on the Starboard 1 (S1) truss. During the lubrication task on the Port SARJ, some of the bolts on one of the thermal blankets came free, and one was lost. Commander Mark Kelly documented the spacewalk with still and video cameras, while mission specialist Greg Chamitoff assisted Feustel and Fincke. The spacewalk was the seventh for Fincke and the fifth for Feustel. Fincke had conducted his previous six spacewalks in Russian Orlan suits.

While the EVA was conducted, the rest of the STS-134 crew completed more transfers between the ISS and  Endeavour. Flight day 7 also saw the ISS' change of command ceremony. Russian cosmonaut Dmitri Kondratyev, who had been the commander of Expedition 27 aboard the station, conducted a ceremonial change of command with cosmonaut Andrei Borisenko, the commander of Expedition 28.

May 23 (Flight Day 8)

On flight day 8, the crew of STS-134 had some off duty time. Commander Mark Kelly and mission specialist Mike Fincke conducted an in-flight interview with 400 students from Mesa Verde Elementary School in Tucson, Arizona. Later in the crew day, STS-134 mission specialist Roberto Vittori and Expedition 27 flight engineer Paolo Nespoli answered questions from Italian President Giorgio Napolitano.

After the STS-134 crew went to bed, the Expedition 27 crew prepared for their departure. Expedition 27 commander Dmitri Kondratyev and flight engineers Paolo Nespoli and Catherine Coleman left the ISS aboard the Soyuz TMA-20 spacecraft at 21:35 UTC. The departure of the three Expedition 27 crew members marked the start of Expedition 28, leaving the new expedition commander Andrei Borisenko and flight engineers Aleksandr Samokutyayev and Ron Garan aboard the station. Before re-entry, Soyuz TMA-20 performed a special fly-about of the ISS, taking numerous photographs of the station and of Endeavour. Soyuz TMA-20 and the Expedition 27 crew landed safely in central Kazakhstan at 02:27 UTC on May 24, 2011.

May 24 (Flight Day 9)

On flight day 9, mission specialist Greg Chamitoff and pilot Greg Johnson conducted a series of interviews with media outlets around the United States, including KPIX-TV, KGO-TV and KFBK. Later in the day, commander Mark Kelly and mission specialists Mike Fincke and Chamitoff conducted interviews with The Daily, KDKA, Pittsburgh Tribune-Review and KTRK-TV. Johnson and mission specialist Roberto Vittori also completed some more equipment transfers between the station and shuttle, and began to clean up and organize the Permanent Multipurpose Module (PMM) Leonardo. The STS-134 crew furthermore completed some work on the Oxygen Generator System (OGS) and Carbon Dioxide Removal Assembly (CDRA). Drew Feustel, joined by Fincke and Chamitoff, spent most of the day preparing the tools for the following day's EVA. At the end of their day, the shuttle crew and Expedition 28 flight engineer Ron Garan conducted an EVA procedures review in preparation for the third spacewalk on flight day 10.

May 25 (Flight Day 10 – EVA 3)
On flight day 10, the third spacewalk of the STS-134 mission was conducted. The spacewalk made use of a new spacewalk pre-breathe protocol, called In-Suit Light Exercise (ISLE), instead of the normal campout pre-breathe protocol. The new pre-breathe protocol had the astronauts breathe pure oxygen for 60 minutes in the airlock, which had its air pressure lowered to 10.2 Psi (703hPa). The astronauts then put their spacesuits on, performed light exercise and rested for an additional 50 minutes, breathing pure oxygen all the while. After astronauts Drew Feustel and Mike Fincke exited the Quest Airlock, the pair began installing the Power Data Grapple Fixture (PDGF). The fixture itself and most of its components were installed, but the data cable associated with it was to be installed later. The spacewalking pair then moved on and routed some new power cables from the Unity module to the Zarya module on the Russian segment of the ISS, providing a redundant power supply to the Russian segment. Feustel and Fincke then moved on to finish up the installation of the wireless video system which Fuestel and Greg Chamitoff had begun to install on EVA 1. The pair also took pictures of the Zarya module's thrusters and captured some infrared video of an experiment delivered on board the Express Logistics Carrier (ELC) 3. Commander Mark Kelly documented the spacewalk from inside the station. While the EVA was going on, pilot Greg Johnson and mission specialist Roberto Vittori assisted Expedition 28 flight engineer Ron Garan in stowing new equipment and supplies on the ISS.

May 26 (Flight Day 11)

On flight day 11, the crew of Space Shuttle Endeavour conducted a late inspection of the orbiter's Thermal Protection System. On most previous flights, this inspection was performed after the shuttle undocked from the ISS. However, in this case it was done early, because the Orbiter Boom Sensor System (OBSS) was to be left on board the ISS after Endeavours departure. The joint Expedition 28/STS-134 crew held a news conference with reporters on the ground at NASA centers around the country and ISS partner agencies. Commander Mark Kelly also spoke to reporters from four Tucson, Arizona television stations. Later in the crew day, the joint crew held an EVA procedure review for the fourth and final spacewalk of STS-134. Astronauts Mike Fincke and Greg Chamitoff spent the night in the Quest Airlock with the air pressure reduced to 10.2 Psi, so as to avoid decompression sickness during their spacewalk. The crew and flight controllers on the ground opted not to use the In-suit Light Exercise (ISLE) protocol that was tested during EVA 3 earlier in the mission, opting instead to go with the standard campout protocol, since it was discovered that ISLE used more carbon-dioxide scrubbing capability. They wanted to save this capability, since a CO2 sensor in Chamitoff's suit had failed during EVA 1, cutting that spacewalk short.

May 27 (Flight Day 12 – EVA 4)

The final spacewalk of the STS-134 mission, and the final spacewalk of the Space Shuttle program, was carried out on flight day 12. The EVA was conducted by Mike Fincke and Greg Chamitoff, who began the EVA by installing the Orbiter Boom Sensor System (OBSS) on the Starboard 1 (S1) truss segment. After the OBSS was installed, Fincke and Chamitoff removed the End Effector Grapple Fixture (EFGF) and replaced it with a spare Power and Data Grapple Fixture (PDGF). The station's Canadarm2 could not grapple the EFGF, so the PDGF was installed on the end. After that task was completed, Fincke and Chamitoff moved to the Express Logistics Carrier (ELC) 3, and released some torque on the bolts that were holding the spare arm for Dextre down against the ELC. The EVA saw the total cumulative time spent performing EVAs in support of the ISS pass the 1,000-hour mark. The three STS-134 spacewalkers spent a total time of 28 hours and 44 minutes outside the ISS on this mission. Commander Mark Kelly assisted with documenting the spacewalk by taking photos and video. In the meantime, the rest of the shuttle crew completed more equipment transfers from Endeavour and the Johannes Kepler ATV to the ISS.

Working from the mid-deck of Endeavour, Andrew Feustel, who participated in the first three spacewalks of the mission, was the EVA 4 choreographer. Astronaut Steven Swanson was the spacewalk CAPCOM from the station flight control room in Houston. During Flight Day 12, Mike Fincke achieved a milestone, becoming the U.S. astronaut with the most time in space, more than 377 days. He surpassed the time in space of astronaut Peggy Whitson.

May 28 (Flight Day 13)
Flight day 13 saw the members of the STS-134 crew complete several major tasks. Mission specialists Mike Fincke and Greg Chamitoff replaced an absorbent bed in the Carbon Dioxide Removal Assembly (CDRA). The beds have to be changed from time to time in order for the CDRA to remove CO2. While the CDRA work was on-going, commander Mark Kelly and mission specialist Drew Feustel re-sized two of the spacesuits that will be used by Expedition 28 flight engineers Ron Garan and Mike Fossum. The rest of the STS-134 crew completed more transfers between Space Shuttle Endeavour and the International Space Station (ISS). Commander Mark Kelly, joined by pilot Greg Johnson and Ron Garan, spoke with students, teachers and others gathered at University of Arizona in Tucson, Arizona. Johnson also spoke with representatives of Gannet, KPRC-TV and the Voice of America.

May 29 (Flight Day 14)
Flight day 14 was the final day for the STS-134 crew to complete activities on board the ISS. Pilot Greg Johnson joined Feustel early in the crew day and spoke with WJRT-TV in Flint, Michigan, WJBK-TV in Detroit, Michigan, WKYC-TV in Cleveland, Ohio and WXMI-TV in Grand Rapids, Michigan. The transfer of supplies and equipment was completed on flight day 14, with the transfer of four bags of water from the shuttle to the ISS. Mission specialist Mike Fincke completed the work on the Carbon Dioxide Removal Assembly (CDRA) that he and Greg Chamitoff had started the day before. Chamitoff was joined by Drew Feustel to finish stowing tools that had been used during the mission's four spacewalks. The later part of the crew day saw the Expedition 28 crew hold a farewell ceremony for the STS-134 crew. After the two crews said their farewells to one another, they got into procedures to close the hatches on the ISS and Space Shuttle. After the hatches were closed and secured, a series of leak checks were performed on both vehicles, and the Pressurized Mating Adapter 2 (PMA 2) was depressurized. The hatch closures marked the end of joint operations which totaled 10 days, 23 hours and 45 minutes.

May 30 (Flight Day 15 – Undocking)
On flight day 15, Space Shuttle Endeavour undocked from the International Space Station. Endeavour had been docked with the ISS for 11 days, 17 hours and 41 minutes. Once the shuttle was at the correct distance, Johnson flew a complete lap around the ISS. After the lap was complete, an initial separation burn was completed. After the burn was complete, commander Mark Kelly took over control of the shuttle. Kelly first moved the shuttle to a point  behind and above the station, then to a point below the ISS. This series of maneuvers was done to test the Sensor Test for Orion Relative Navigation Risk Mitigation (STORRM) sensors. For the rest of the day, the STS-134 crew conducted preparations for their reentry and landing.

May 31 (Flight Day 16)
On flight day 16, the members of Space Shuttle Endeavours STS-134 crew continued preparations for the shuttle's landing on flight day 17. Commander Mark Kelly, pilot Greg Johnson and mission specialist and flight engineer Roberto Vittori performed a checkout of Endeavours Flight Control Systems (FCS). They began by starting Auxiliary Power Unit 1 (APU 1), so they could test the flight systems such as the ailerons and rudder. The APU was used to provide hydraulic pressure to power the flight control systems. The astronauts next moved on to a test of the Reaction Control System (RCS) jets. This test saw Kelly, Johnson and Vittori fire each jet once. Meanwhile, Drew Feustel, Mike Fincke and Greg Chamitoff stowed items on the mid-deck for their return to Earth. Later in the crew day, they stowed the Ku band antenna for re-entry. The crew also performed several experiments, including an eye exam and the Ram Burn Observation (RAMBO2) experiments, and conducted a deorbit briefing to go over the procedures for the landing. The entire crew furthermore participated in in-flight interviews with ABC News, CBS News, CNN, NBC News and Fox News Radio, and sent a crew tribute to Endeavour down to the ground.

June 1 (Flight Day 17 – Re-entry and landing)
The crew was awakened by mission control at 5:57 PM Eastern Time to begin flight day 17 to the song "Sunrise No. 1" by Stormy Mondays. The payload bay doors on the shuttle were closed at 10:48 p.m. EDT. At 1:29 a.m. on June 1, the de-orbit burn was initiated, finishing at 1:31 a.m. The shuttle began reentering the atmosphere at approximately 2:03 a.m. At 2:25 a.m., Endeavour crossed the Florida coast. The shuttle landed safely in Florida at around 2:35 a.m. EDT, completing its 25th and final mission into space.

Spacewalks
There were four spacewalks (EVAs) completed by three astronauts during the flight. The total time spent outside was 28 hours and 44 minutes. The EVAs were the final EVAs conducted by a shuttle crew.

Launch attempts

Wake-up calls
NASA began a tradition of playing music to astronauts during the Gemini program, and first used music to wake up a flight crew during Apollo 15.
Each track is specially chosen, often by the astronauts' families, and usually has a special meaning to an individual member of the crew, or is applicable to their daily activities.

NASA opened the selection process to the public for the first time for STS-133, where the public was invited to vote on two songs used to wake up astronauts on previous missions to wake up the STS-133 crew. For STS-134, the public was invited to submit original songs, with two songs being selected to wake up the crew of Endeavour.

See also

 2011 in spaceflight
 List of human spaceflights
 List of International Space Station spacewalks
 List of Space Shuttle missions
 List of spacewalks 2000–2014
 STS-135

References

External links

 NASA's Space Shuttle page
 NASA's STS-134 mission page
 An animated movie of the STS-134 mission showing the installation of AMS-02  (72MB)
 Unofficial Site providing realtime Updates and Mission Info
 Spherical panorama of Endeavour at the center of the windscreen in OPF-2 
 Spherical panorama of Endeavour at the Aft Fuselage Access Hatch in OPF-2 
 Spherical panorama of Endeavour at the Left SSME in OPF-2 
 Spherical panorama of Endeavour at the tail in OPF-2 
 Spherical panorama of Endeavour at the top of the lift for Lift & Mate in the VAB 
 Spherical panorama of Endeavour on Pad 39A at the tail 
 Spherical panorama of Endeavour on Pad 39A between SSME and right booster 
 Spherical panorama of Endeavour on Pad 39A under the stack at the ET/Orbiter fuel feeds 

Space Shuttle missions
Spacecraft launched in 2011
Spacecraft which reentered in 2011
Articles containing video clips
May 2011 events
2011 in Florida
June 2011 events